A7 is a motorway (freeway) in Portugal.  It connects Póvoa de Varzim to Vila Pouca de Aguiar, its main purpose was to give a fast access to the shoreline by inland cities, such as Guimarães and Vila Nova de Famalicão, thus a toll is applied.

Construction of this motorway started in 2001 and known as EIA - A7/IC5 - Lanço Póvoa de Varzim/ Famalicão which affected three archaeological sites, two of which protohistoric: Castro de Argivai in Póvoa de Varzim (a probable protohistoric farmhouse), the surrounding archeological area of Cividade de Bagunte (a protohistoric city) and Quinta dos Cavaleiros (a villa related to Nuno Álvares Pereira and in the dominium of the counts of Cavaleiros), both of the later in Vila do Conde's countryside. Possible existence of prehistoric tumuli were surveyed but delivered no results. One of the most affected sites was Castro de Argivai. During construction in 2002, ceramics and ruins of walls surfaced

References

Motorways in Portugal